Arisugacin A is an orally-active acetylcholinesterase inhibitor.

References

Lactones
Acetylcholinesterase inhibitors
Methoxy compounds